Leiolepis ngovantrii (Vietnamese: Nhông cát trinh sản, meaning "parthenogenic sand iguana") is a species of lizard that is all-female, reproducing clonally. The species is named after Vietnamese herpetologist Ngo Van Tri (born 1969) of the Vietnam Academy of Science and Technology, and is believed to be related to two other Vietnamese lizard species, Leiolepis guttata and Leiolepis guentherpetersi. This species is one of four unisexual Leiolepis agamospecies. However, the genus Leiolepis has five different bisexual species. This unisexuality is possibly due to mutation and hybridization.

Description
L. ngovantrii in the type series measure  in snout–vent length. The lizard's back is covered with brown spots with pairs of yellow stripes running along her sides. Her coloring provides adequate camouflage in coastal sandy soil, as well as the mangrove forests during the dry season when grasses and leaves turn pale yellow.

Scientific discovery
Though the lizard has been long known to and enjoyed by locals in Vietnam's Mekong River Delta, scientists described the species in 2010 after seeing them sold and eaten in many remote Vietnamese village restaurants in Bà Rịa–Vũng Tàu province, South Vietnam.

References

Leiolepis
Reptiles of Vietnam
Endemic fauna of Vietnam
Bà Rịa-Vũng Tàu province
Reptiles described in 2010
Taxa named by Jesse L. Grismer
Taxa named by Larry Lee Grismer
2010 in Vietnam